The 2015 Apia International Sydney women's singles was a joint 2015 ATP World Tour and 2015 WTA Tour tennis tournament, played on outdoor hard courts in Sydney, New South Wales, Australia.

Tsvetana Pironkova was the defending champion, but lost in the semifinals to Petra Kvitová. Kvitová won the title by defeating compatriot Karolína Plíšková in the final, 7–6 (7–5), 7–6 (8–6).

Seeds
The top two seeds received a bye into the second round.

Draw

Finals

Top half

Bottom half

Qualifying

Seeds

Qualifiers

Lucky loser
  Nicole Gibbs

Draw

First qualifier

Second qualifier

Third qualifier

Fourth qualifier

References
 Main Draw
 Qualifying Draw

Women's Singles